Nuruzzaman Nayan is a Bangladeshi retired footballer who played as a goalkeeper, and is the goalkeeping coach of Bashundhara Kings. He is the first-ever Bangladeshi goalkeeping coach to get AFC/FFA Goalkeeping Level 1 and Level 2 licence. He was the goalkeeper coach of Bangladesh in 2021 SAFF Championship.

He is regarded as the country's most qualified goalkeeping coach with several coaching licences. In 2016, he achieved AFC Goakeeping Level 1 Coaching Certificate as first Bangladeshi. He is also an AFC 'A' Coaching Licence holder and a coach instructor. Nayan is the former goalkeeping coach of both Bangladesh men's football team and Bangladesh women's football team. He played for more than ten years in domestic football.

Honours

Head coach
Abahani Limited Dhaka women's team
 Bangladesh Women's Football League 2013-14

Goalkeeping coach
Bashundhara Kings
 Bangladesh Premier League: 2020-21
 Bangladesh Premier League: 2021-22
 Federation Cup: 2019–20
 Federation Cup: 2020–21
 Independence Cup: 2022

Dhaka Mohammedan SC
 Independence Cup: 2014

References

1980 births
Living people
Bangladeshi footballers
Association football goalkeepers
Association football goalkeeping coaches
Bangladeshi football coaches